Todo El Mundo is the third studio album of Puerto Rican reggaeton artist Miguelito. It was released on June 22, 2010.

Track list

References 

Miguelito (singer) albums
2010 albums